Monotaxis is the generic name of two groups of organisms. It can refer to:
 Monotaxis (fish), a genus of fish in the family Lethrinidae
 Monotaxis (plant), a genus of plants in the family Euphorbiaceae
 Monotaxis, a genus of moths in the family Geometridae; synonym of Monostoecha